The Verdant Braes of Screen is a traditional Irish song. It is believed that the Screen refers to Ballinascreen in County Londonderry, Northern Ireland. Brae refers to a hillside, especially along a river.

Interpretations

The song has been interpreted by Tomas O'Canainn, John Renbourn, Mick Hanly, Keven Moyna, Cathal Lynch, The Beggarmen, Maranna McCloskey, Terence O'Flaherty, An Tor, Cara Dillon, Cherish The Ladies, Steve Tilston and Maggie Boyle, Louis Killen and Altan.

See also
Music of Ireland

References

The Pennyburn Piper Presents Uilleann Pipes, Tomas O'Canainn

Irish songs
Year of song unknown
Songwriter unknown